Il tifoso, l'arbitro e il calciatore (The Supporter, the Referee and the Footballer)  is a 1983 Italian comedy film written and directed by Pier Francesco Pingitore.

Cast 

 Segment L'arbitro e il calciatore
Alvaro Vitali as Alvaro Presutti
Carmen Russo as  Manuela Presutti 
Enzo Cannavale as Sposito
Marisa Merlini as The Mother-in-law
 Marco Gelardini as  Walter Grass 
Luigi Montini as Dr. Moroni

 Segment Il tifoso
Pippo Franco as Amedeo
Daniela Poggi as  Patrizia Pecorazzi
Mario Carotenuto as  Sor Memmo
Gigi Reder as  Commendator Pecorazzi
Lucio Montanaro as Bazzettone
Roberto Della Casa as  Sportelli 
Gianfranco Barra as  Capo del personale 
Franco Caracciolo as  Armando Sgabelloni

See also
 List of Italian films of 1983

References

External links

1983 films
Italian sports comedy films
1980s sports comedy films
Films set in Rome
Films shot in Rome
Italian association football films
Films directed by Pier Francesco Pingitore
1983 comedy films
1980s Italian films
1980s Italian-language films